Denise J. Smyler is an American attorney and former General Counsel of Pennsylvania, who served on the executive staff of Pennsylvania Governor Tom Wolf. She was previously a member of the Philadelphia Redevelopment Authority Board and an assistant district attorney.

The first female counsel to a Philadelphia police commissioner and the first female to serve as counsel to a Philadelphia prison commissioner, she was also the third woman and first African American to be appointed as Pennsylvania's general counsel.

In December 2019, she was appointed by Wolf to the Pennsylvania Gaming Control Board.

Biography 
Smyler is the founding attorney and owner of the Smyler Firm, which united with Wadud Ahmad and Joseph Zaffarese to form Ahmad, Zaffarese & Smyler, LLC in September 2013. Prior to her state appointment, Smyler worked as an assistant district attorney and as legal counsel to the Philadelphia Prison Commissioner before being appointed chief legal counsel to the Philadelphia Police Commissioner.

Commonwealth public service
Smyler headed the Office of General Counsel (OGC), overseeing the provision of legal services to the governor, his senior staff, and more than thirty executive branch and independent agencies. As head of OGC, she worked to improve client service and strengthen the capacity of OGC lawyers. Among her accomplishments during her first eighteen months as general counsel, Smyler worked with Wolf to expand and create opportunities for small and diverse law firms to serve the Commonwealth as outside counsel.

In December 2019, Wolf appointed her to the Pennsylvania Gaming Control Board.

References

External links
Pennsylvania Office of General Counsel

Living people
Pennsylvania Office of General Counsel
Pennsylvania lawyers
New York University alumni
Georgetown University Law Center alumni
21st-century American lawyers
Year of birth missing (living people)